The Guangzhou Military Region was from 1955 to 2016 one of the People's Liberation Army PLA Military Regions, located in the south of the People's Republic of China. In May 1949, the Central China (Hua Zhong) Military Region (MR) was formed. In March 1955, it was divided into two, the Guangzhou MR and the Wuhan Military Region. When the Wuhan MR was disbanded in August 1985, its troops stationed around the Hubei province were assigned to the Guangzhou MR.

The region was disestablished in 2016 and reorganised as the Southern Theater Command.

Just before being disbanded, the Guangzhou MR controlled the Guangdong Province, Guangxi Autonomous Region, Hunan Province, Hubei Province, and the Hainan Province Military Districts. The Hong Kong and Macau garrisons were within the Guangzhou MR area but reported directly to the Central Military Commission.

There were two Group Armies within the Region, the 41st Group Army and 42nd Group Army, and in 2006 the International Institute for Strategic Studies said the region had some 180,000 personnel, one mechanised division, three motorised infantry divisions, one artillery division, two armoured brigades, one artillery brigade, and two anti-aircraft brigades. The 123rd (Amphibious) Infantry Division (53023) at Guigang/Guangxi and 124th Infantry Divisions at Boluo, Guangdong had been identified as Rapid Reaction Units. The Hong Kong garrison includes a brigade with a helicopter unit.

The PLA's 15th Airborne Corps was also located in this MR though not under its command.

List of commanders 

 Huang Yongsheng, 1955−68
 Li Tianyou
 Ding Sheng
 Xu Shiyou, 1973−80
 Wu Kehua, 1980−82
 You Taizhong, 1982−87
 Zhang Wannian
 Liu Cunzhi
 Zhu Dunfa
 Li Xilin
 Tao Bojun
 Liu Zhenwu
 Zhang Qinsheng, 2007−09
 Xu Fenlin, 2009−present

Ground Forces

41st Group Army (Command Center:Liuzhou) consists of 2 divisions and 3 brigades
121st Mechanized Infantry Division(Liuzhou)
123rd Mechanized Infantry Division(Guigang)
Armored Brigade(Guilin)
Anti-Aircraft Brigade (Hengyang)
Artillery Brigade(Liuzhou)
42nd Group Army (Command Center:Huizhou) consists of 2 divisions and 4 brigades
124th Amphibious Mechanized Infantry Division (Boluo)
163rd Mechanized Infantry Division(Chaozhou)
Anti-Aircraft Brigade (Jieyang)
Special Operation Battalion(Guangzhou)
Electronic Warfare Regiment(Huadu)
6th Regiment of the Army Aviation(Sanshui)
Engineering Regiment(Huizhou)
Anti-Chemical Warfare Regiment(Shenzhen)
Driver and Medic Training Battalion(Dongguan)
Training Regiment(Huizhou)

Air Force
Commander:Lt. Gen. Han Ruijie
Political Officer: Lt. Gen. Wang Jilian
Deputy Commander:Maj. Gen. Zhang Shutian

In June 1962, the second Shantou Command Post became the 7th Air Corps. After a move to Xingning in Guangdong Province, it moved to Nanning, Guangxi Autonomous Region, in August 1964.

The 48th Aviation Division was active, initially under the 12th Air Corps, from 1971 to 1992. 

7th Air Corps
2nd Fighter Division: Suixi, Liuzhou Su-27, J-7
9th (Fighter) Division  : Foshan, Shaoguan, Guangzhou, Xingning J-8D, J-7B, J-10
42nd (Fighter) Division : Nanning, Ningming, Guilin J-10
Air Force in Wuhan Base
13th (Transport) Division : Wangjiadun AirportHankou, Dangyang, Kaifeng Y-7, Y-8, IL-76
18 (Fighter) Division : Changsha, Hengyang J-8D, J-7, Su-30
8th (Bomber) Division : Leiyang, Qidong H-6, H-6U
15th Airborne Corps
43rd Airborne Division:Kaifeng, Henan
44th Airborne Division Guangshui, Hubei
45th Airborne Division Huangpi, Hubei

Nickname
Organizations affiliated with the Guangzhou Military Region often use the nickname "warrior", including the Warrior Performance Troupe and the Warrior Newspaper.

References

Citations

Sources 

 Chapter 8, PLA Ground Forces, by Dennis J Blasko, in The People's Liberation Army as Organisation, RAND, CF182

 
Military regions of the People's Liberation Army
Military units and formations established in 1955
Military units and formations disestablished in 2016
1955 establishments in China